Petit Grepon is a semi-detached spire in Colorado's Rocky Mountain National Park.  It is one of the "Cathedral Spires" which also includes: Sharkstooth, The Saber, and The Foil. The South Face route of Petit Grepon is described in the historic climbing text Fifty Classic Climbs of North America and considered a classic around the world.

See also
List of Colorado mountain ranges
List of Colorado mountain summits
List of Colorado fourteeners
List of Colorado 4000 meter prominent summits
List of the most prominent summits of Colorado
List of Colorado county high points

References

External links
mountainproject.com
summitpost.org
rockclimbing.com

Climbing routes
Mountains of Colorado
Rock formations of Colorado
Mountains of Larimer County, Colorado
North American 3000 m summits
Rocky Mountain National Park